El Campu is one of ten parishes (administrative divisions) in Caso, a municipality within the province and autonomous community of Asturias, in northern Spain.

The postal code is 33990.

Villages and hamlets
 El Barru
 El Campu
 Veneros

Other small places 
 El Barriquín
 L'Arrobiu
 L'Azorea
 La Yana
 Les Yanes
 Moñu

References

Parishes in Caso